Aarti Bajaj is an Indian film editor. She is an editor working in Bollywood currently. She has edited films such as  Jab We Met and Aamir.

Education 
Aarti Bajaj moved from Delhi to Mumbai to pursue her dream of working in films at the age of 21. She did a film course in 1994 at the Xavier Institute of Communication, Mumbai. She said in an interview with India Today, "My dad threw a fit when he heard of my decision to head to Mumbai. But I told him I would run away if he didn't let me go, so he reluctantly gave in." In her internships with Bardroy Baretto and Shyam Ramanna, she "fell in love with the whole process of rewriting a film at the edit table." Having gained some experience, she began editing for music videos and advertisements. Over eight years, she became an established independent editor.

Career
Aarti Bajaj began editing with Anurag Kashyap's unreleased film Paanch. She followed it with his controversial and acclaimed film Black Friday for which she was nominated for a Star Screen Award in 2008. She has also edited Reema Kagti's Honeymoon Travels Pvt. Ltd., Imtiaz Ali's Jab We Met, Rockstar, Tamasha, Highway and Rajkumar Gupta's Aamir, for which she was nominated for her second Star Screen Award. Later, she edited Kashyap's Dev.D, Gulaal, Ugly, Raman Raghav 2.0, Mukkabaaz, Sacred Games and Manmarziyaan. An article on The Hindu describes her as "one of those rare new-age film editors who lets the narrative breathe, supremely confident of her pacing."

In the same article, Bajaj describes her process of deciding which film she wants to contribute to. It is true that many of her works are films which are different from what one expects from the average Bollywood movie. She answers in The Hindu interview, "I enjoy mainstream Bollywood, but I don't know if I can edit them. What's the point of doing the same formula again? What do you look forward to? I know I will go brain-dead." She also adds, "I like quirky, I like different." She goes on to emphasise the importance of mental stimulation and how every project she does must present to her some sort of challenge. Her professionalism is such that she only does one project at a time to ensure compete focus.

Bajaj has worked on films across different genres, from Rockstar to Sacred Games, which demand different editing styles, and has proved herself to be a versatile editor.

Filmography

References

External links
 

Living people
Hindi film editors
Indian women film editors
Film editors from Uttar Pradesh
Women artists from Uttar Pradesh
1974 births